

The Canadian Medical Hall of Fame is a Canadian charitable organization, founded in 1994, that honours Canadians who have contributed to the understanding of disease and improving the health of people. It has an exhibit hall in London, Ontario, an annual induction ceremony, career exploration programs for youth and a virtual hall of fame.

Laureates

References

External links
 Official site

1994 establishments in Ontario
Health charities in Canada
Halls of fame in Canada
Organizations based in London, Ontario
Museums established in 1994
Companies based in London, Ontario
Museums in London, Ontario
Medical museums in Canada
Science and technology halls of fame